Aaron Hill (born 28 February 2002) is an Irish professional snooker player.

Career 
In March 2020, Hill won the EBSA European Under-21 Snooker Championships, as a result, he was awarded a two-year card on the World Snooker Tour for the 2020–21 and 2021–22.

On 24 September 2020, Hill defeated current World Champion Ronnie O'Sullivan 5–4 in the last 64 of the European Masters.

At the 2022 Northern Ireland Open, Hill defeated ranking world number 2 Judd Trump 4-1 to advance to the last 32.

Performance and rankings timeline

Career finals

Amateur finals: 5 (3 titles)

References

External links
Snooker.org Profile

2002 births
Living people
Irish snooker players